Olugbenga Agboola   (born 1985) is a Nigerian software engineer and entrepreneur. He is the CEO and co-founder of Flutterwave.

Career 
Born in Lagos, Agboola is a graduate of the MBA program at MIT Sloan School of Management. Prior to founding Flutterwave with Iyinoluwa Aboyeji in 2016, he worked as an application engineer at PayPal and in product management at Google.

National Honours 
Agboola was decorated with Nigeria's National Honour Medal of the Officer of the Order of Niger (OON) by President Muhammadu Buhari in recognition of his contributions to the advancement of technology, innovations and economic development. He was awarded the honour alongside Ameyo Adadevoh, Abubakar Abdullahi, Jim Ovia, Tony Elumelu, amongst others.

Recognition & Awards 
Agboola was listed on Fortune's 40 Under 40 list in 2020. He was also on Time's Next 100 list in 2021.  In April 2022, Agboola received the Tech Investor of the Year award in the Business Insider Africa awards.

References 

Nigerian engineers
Living people
1985 births
Nigerian technology businesspeople
MIT Sloan School of Management alumni
Yoruba businesspeople